Caesar Colclough may refer to:

 Sir Caesar Colclough, 2nd Baronet (1624–1684), MP for Newcastle-under-Lyme
 Sir Caesar Colclough, 3rd Baronet (c. 1650–1687) of the Colclough baronets
 Caesar Colclough (died 1726), MP for Taghmon
 Caesar Colclough (1696–1766), MP for County Wexford (Parliament of Ireland constituency)
 Caesar Colclough (judge) (1754–1822), Chief Justice in Court of Appeal of Newfoundland and Labrador
 Caesar Colclough (1766–1842), MP for County Wexford (Parliament of Ireland constituency)